Thenkarai Ramakrishna Mahalingam (16 June 1924 - 21 April 1978) born in Sholavandan Thenkarai was an Indian actor, singer and music composer of the 1940s and 1950s. He was known for his melodious songs mostly based on romantic or devotional themes.

Early days
Mahalingam's career as an actor and singer began since his childhood. He regularly appeared in stage plays popularly called special dramas. Mahalingam trained as a singer during the time when microphones and amplifiers were rarely present in performance halls. His music training, like those of singers S. G. Kittappa, Krishnan, M. K. Thyagaraja Bhagavathar and to a large extent TMS, stressed voice projection and singing loud so as to be audible in large auditoriums. So it was that in 1933, when the prominent singer Kittappa died at the early age of 28, Mahalingam got his first break in films..

Acting
In 1937, at the age of 14, Mahalingam got the chance to appear in the film Nandakumar, the third film produced by AVM. The film was based on the story of Lord Krishna wherein Mahalingam was chosen to play the lead role. The film failed at the box office in all the three languages (Tamil, Hindi and Marathi) in which it was made. Nevertheless, it received great accolades for its songs.

Mahalingam got his big break in the film Sri Valli made at the height of the Second World War, in which he played the part of Lord Murugan. The film did well at the box-office and established Mahalingam's reputation as both an actor and a singer.

Music composers he sang for
Many music directors gave him memorable songs, including S. V. Venkatraman, K. V. Mahadevan, Viswanathan–Ramamoorthy, G. Ramanathan, Sharma Brothers, T. A. Kalyanam, C. N. Pandurangan, Lalitha Venkatraman, T. Rajagopala Sarma, C. R. Subburaman, T. G. Lingappa, S. Rajeswara Rao, R. Sudarsanam, and Kunnakkudi Vaidyanathan.

Playback singers he sang with
While Mahalingam had many solo hit songs, he also sang with other singers.

He sang the most number of duets with S. Varalakshmi.

He also sang duets with other female singers: P. A. Periyanayaki, T. R. Rajakumari, P. Bhanumathi, T. V. Rathnam, A. P. Komala, Soolamangalam Jayalakshmi, Soolamangalam Rajalakshmi, T. S. Bagavathi, S. Janaki, P. Leela and P. Suseela.

He was also paired to sing with male singers such as Seerkazhi Govindarajan and S. C. Krishnan.

Filmography

References

 Detailed biography of actor T. R. Mahalingam
 Article on T. R. Mahalingam by Shaji
 
 T. R. Mahalingam,the Actor Singer in My Movie Minutes

1924 births
Indian male film actors
Tamil playback singers
1978 deaths
Tamil male actors
20th-century Indian male actors
20th-century Indian singers
Indian male playback singers
Indian male composers
20th-century Indian composers
Tamil musicians
20th-century Indian male singers